Waiting at the Church is a popular British music hall song by Vesta Victoria.

Waiting at the Church may also refer to:

Films
Waiting at the Church (1906 film), directed by Edwin S. Porter
Waiting at the Church (1911 film), produced by Carl Laemmle
Waiting at the Church (1919 film), directed by Eddie Lyons
Waiting at the Church, alternate title for The Runaround (1931 film), directed by William James Craft

Books
Waiting at the Church (1937 book), written by Wilbur Braun
Waiting at the Church (1958 book), written by L. du Garde Peach
Waiting at the Church (1968 book), written by Charity Blackstock